The 1961 Purdue Boilermakers football team represented Purdue University during the 1961 Big Ten Conference football season. Led by sixth-year head coach Jack Mollenkopf, the Boilermakers compiled and overall record of 6–3 with a mark of 4–2 in conference play, placing fourth in the Big Ten.

Schedule

References

Purdue
Purdue Boilermakers football seasons
Purdue Boilermakers football